Parergodrilidae is an enigmatic family of polychaetes with only two genera, one living on the coast, the other terrestrial.

They share much in common with the clitellates, but molecular data place them with Questa and Orbiniidae.

References

Polychaetes